Reach Out: The Motown Record is Human Nature's fifth studio album released on 6 November 2005 by Sony BMG Music Entertainment. It won the 2006 ARIA Music Award for Highest Selling Album. It debuted at number #6 on the Australian ARIA Album Chart but worked its way up to #1. On the album, the band perform their own renditions of eleven soul music classics. The tracks include renditions of The Four Tops' "Reach Out I'll Be There", The Temptations' "My Girl", The Supremes' "Stop! In the Name of Love", The Jackson 5's "I'll Be There" and Marvin Gaye's "I Heard It Through the Grapevine". Produced by Paul Wiltshire for PLW Productions.  Following an appearance on the New Zealand edition of Dancing with the Stars, the album debuted at #4 on the New Zealand albums chart more than a year after its release, climbing to its peak of #2 the following week.

The album represented a major new musical direction for the group, which had previously performed boy-band style pop. The change re-invigorated their popularity, resulting in their best sales in a decade.

Track listing

Charts and certifications

Weekly charts

Year-end charts

Decade-end chart

Certifications

See also
 List of top 25 albums for 2006 in Australia

See also 
Young Divas

References

ARIA Award-winning albums
Human Nature (band) albums
2005 albums
Motown cover albums